The Wu River is the largest southern tributary of the Yangtze River. Nearly its entire length of  runs within the isolated, mountainous and ethnically diverse province of Guizhou. The river takes drainage from a  watershed.

The river flows through the Liupanshui, Anshun, Guiyang (the capital), Qiannan, and Zunyi Districts of Guizhou. All nine regions of the province have at least partial drainage to the river.

Course

It then bends north, west and south in a  reach called the Yachi, and receives the Nanming River from the right. After the Yachi reach, the Wu makes a broad arc northeast through central Guizhou, picking up fifteen major tributaries including the Yu, Furong and Ya Rivers and flowing through several large hydroelectric dams. Part of the lower course of the river is flooded by the reservoir of Three Gorges Dam.

History
Many small river towns along the Wu, such as Gongtan, date back to as early as 200 A.D. Fuling is regarded as the first major town to be built on the river. The city was the capital of the ancient Ba state in the Sichuan area. During the Qin Dynasty, the region was brought under Chinese control.

The Wu Gorge is also known as "Golden Helmet and Silver Armor Gorge". The name originates from a helmet-shaped rock formation above the river and a silver-colored cliff of slate. Another name for Wu Gorge is "Iron Coffin Gorge".

River modifications
The Wu River has been extensively developed for hydroelectricity generation. , dams along the river had a combined capacity of 8,500 megawatts (MW). Much of this development is extremely recent, as power generation in 2010 was over four times of that in 2005. Most dams on the river were constructed and owned by the Wujiang Hydropower Corporation. The largest dam, the  Goupitan Dam, was completed in 2011. Aside from producing power, dams on the Wu River also provide flood control and hydraulic head for irrigation operations.

The lower reaches of the river are heavily polluted because of poor sewage systems and dumping of agricultural waste – so much that it is not even considered suitable for irrigation and industrial purposes.

The 10 dams on the river that are either completed, under construction or planned, are listed below from downstream to upstream.
Daxikou Dam – Cancelled, 1,200 MW
Baimato Dam – Programmed, 350 MW
Yinpan Dam – Completed, 600 MW
Pengshui Dam – Completed, 1,750 MW
Shatuo Dam – Completed, 1,120 MW
Silin Dam – Completed, 1,050 MW
Goupitan Dam – Completed, 3,000 MW
Wujiangdu Dam – Completed, 1,250 MW
Suofengying Dam – Completed, 600 MW
Dongfeng Dam – Completed, 695 MW

Navigation
In the 1950s, local governments began an ambitious project to increase the navigability of the Wu River. The lower  of the river were dredged of sediment and hundreds of sets of rapids were destroyed by explosive charges. Navigation on the upper river, in contrast, reflects the difficulty of traversing the Yangtze in the Three Gorges region before the construction of Three Gorges Dam. With the creation of the reservoir behind this dam, navigation on the lower reaches of the Wu has increased significantly.

Bridges

There are many spectacular bridges along the course of the Wu River. These include (from mouth heading upstream):
 Fuling Arch Bridge
 Fuling Wu River Bridge
 Jiangjiehe Bridge
 Zunyi Bridge
 Wujiang Viaduct
 Liuguanghe Xiqian Expressway Bridge under construction
 Liuguanghe Bridge
 Yachi Railway Bridge under construction
 Yachi Bridge
 Najiehe Railway Bridge
 Dimuhe River Bridge

See also
List of rivers of China

References

Rivers of Guizhou
Rivers of Chongqing
Tributaries of the Yangtze River